The Stephanoberyciformes are an order of marine ray-finned fishes, consisting of about 68 species, the majority (61) of which belong to the ridgehead family (Melamphaidae). The Stephanoberyciformes are mostly uncommon deep-sea species with little, if any, importance to commercial fishery. They share many morphological similarities with the Beryciformes, their sister order.

Some sources classify their other close relatives, the whalefishes, as a superfamily herein, named Cetomimoidea. Most taxa traditionally placed here would then be the Stephanoberyciodea.

The families are:
 Melamphaidae – ridgeheads (about 61 species)
 Gibberichthyidae – gibberfishes (2 species)
 Stephanoberycidae – pricklefishes (4 species)
 Hispidoberycidae - Bristlyskin (1 species)

Common characteristics include a generally rounded body, a toothless palate, rather thin skull bones, and a missing orbitosphenoid bone (except for Hispidoberyx).

The gibberfishes on the other hand appear to be closer to whalefishes such as Rondeletia, as has been proposed time and again. These two groups have - apparently as only living fishes - the mysterious Tominaga's organ (A large mass of globular white tissue, that present anterior to the orbit and posterior and medial to the nostrils and nasal rosette). Rondeletia, meanwhile, is suspected to be very close to the velvet whalefish, Barbourisia rufa.

Footnotes

References
  (2006): Fishes of the World (4th ed.). 
  (2001): Larvae and juveniles of the deepsea "whalefishes" Barbourisia and Rondeletia (Stephanoberyciformes: Barbourisiidae, Rondeletiidae), with comments on family relationships. Records of the Australian Museum 53(3): 407-425. PDF fulltext

External links

 
Ray-finned fish orders